Ripening Youth (German: Reifende Jugend) is a 1933 German drama film directed by Carl Froelich and starring Heinrich George, Peter Voß and Hertha Thiele.

The film's sets were designed by the art directors Karl Machus, Otto Moldenhauer and Franz Schroedter. Location shooting took place at Stralsund on the Baltic coast. It was well-received by the Nazi press on its release, and drew inspiration from the earlier Madchen in Uniform which was admired by film journalists of the Third Reich.

Synopsis
When three girls transfer to an elite school in Lübeck so they can sit their upcoming university entrance examinations this causes disruptions amongst the male students and teachers. One of the girls Elfriede becomes the subject of romantic interest from both a classmate and her strict teacher, ultimately opting for the latter. At the end all three girls pass their exams with full marks.

Cast
 Heinrich George as Brodersen, Studiendirektor 
 Peter Voß as Studienassesor Dr. Kerner 
 Hertha Thiele as Elfriede Albing, Abiturientin 
 Marieluise Claudius as Christa von Borck, Abiturientin 
 Albert Lieven as Knud Sengebusch, Abiturient 
 Paul Henckels as Dr. Hepp, Lehrer 
 Albert Florath as Nehring, Musiklehrer 
 Sabine Peters as Annelore Winkel, Abiturientin 
 Rolf Kästner  as Bert Fredereksen, Abiturient 
 Carsta Löck as Stine Nockelmann, Tochter des Hausmeister 
 Herbert Hübner as Dr. Albing 
 Paul Mederow as Dr. Stahnke, Lehrer 
 Julius E. Herrmann as Dr. Steffenhagen, Lehrer 
 Hermann Noack as Fritz Hannemann, Abiturient 
 Jochen Kuhlmey as Walter Mettke, Klassen-Primus 
 Horst Beck as Karl Maier, Abiturient 
 Hans Engelhardt as Willi Holzhüter, Abiturient 
 Dieter Horn as Franz Möller, Abiturient 
 Friedrich Karl as Erwin Pape, Quintaner 
 Hugo Froelich as Nockelmann, Hausmeister 
 Anneliese Würtz as Frau Nockelmann 
 Else Bötticher as Frau Albing 
 Fritz Reiff as Herr Sengebusch 
 Nany Mangelsdorf as Frau Mettke 
 Ellen Geyer as Dienstmädchen bei Dr. Kerner 
 Jochen Blume as Andreas Bolz, Abiturient 
 H.J. Wieland as Otto Ohlerich, Abiturient 
 Herbert Stockder as Herrmann Puttbrese, Abiturient 
 Andree Hanfmann as Ernst Rauch, Abiturient

Reception 
Writing for The Spectator in 1936, Graham Greene described the film as entertaining and praised the film's charmingly realistic characterization of both German school masters and their pupils. Greene highlighted the "light lyrical treatment of some of the scenes", adding that while "unsentimental, [the film is] not unkindly [in its depiction] of emotional awkwardness."

References

Bibliography
 Heins, Laura. Nazi Film Melodrama. University of Illinois Press, 2013.

External links 
 

1933 films
1933 drama films
German drama films
Films of Nazi Germany
1930s German-language films
Films directed by Carl Froelich
German black-and-white films
Films set in schools
Tobis Film films
1930s German films